The 1928 season was the seventeenth season for Santos FC.

References

External links
Official Site 

Santos
1928
1928 in Brazilian football